is a railway station on the Takayama Main Line in Toyama, Toyama, Japan, operated by the West Japan Railway Company (JR West).

Lines

Station layout
The station consists of one ground-level side platform serving a bidirectional single track. The station is unattended.

Adjacent stations

History
The station opened on 15 March 2008.

Passenger statistics
In fiscal 2015, the station was used by an average of 193 passengers daily (boarding passengers only).

See also
 List of railway stations in Japan

References

External links

  

Railway stations in Toyama Prefecture
Stations of West Japan Railway Company
Railway stations in Japan opened in 2008
Takayama Main Line
Toyama (city)